Gordon Kenneth MacLeod, MD (1929–2007) was a physician and professor of health services administration at the University of Pittsburgh Graduate School of Public Health, who also served as the state of Pennsylvania's secretary of health (1979–1980).

From 1966 to 1972, MacLeod was an associate clinical professor of medicine and public health at the Yale School of Medicine and Chief of the Yale Diagnostic Clinic, and was co-founder with I.S. Falk of the Community Health Care Center Plan in New Haven, Connecticut.

In 1971, MacLeod developed and became the director of the United States' first federal Health Maintenance Organization (HMO) program. He was recruited by Elliot Richardson, former secretary of the U.S. Department of Health, Education and Welfare.

In 1972–1973, MacLeod carried out a Ford Foundation study of three European health care systems in Britain, Germany, and Denmark, while residing in Geneva, Switzerland, with his wife and two sons for six months, from October 1 to March 31.

In 1979, as Pennsylvania State Secretary of Health, he managed the health effects of the Three Mile Island accident as well as the polio epidemic among the Amish in the central part of the state. He criticized Pennsylvania's preparedness, in the event of a nuclear accident, at the time for not having potassium iodide in stock, which protects the thyroid gland in the event of radiation exposure, as well as for not having any physicians on Pennsylvania's equivalent of the nuclear regulatory commission. When McLeod announced nine months after the accident that child mortality in a ten-mile radius around the plant had doubled, he was fired by the governor.

MacLeod was elected President of the University Senate and of the Faculty Assembly of the University of Pittsburgh in 1997.

He also co-edited and wrote several chapters of Health Care Capital: Competition and Control, which was the first book written on capital financing of health care services.

Publications

MacLeod, Gordon K. MD (ed.) 1978. Health Care Capital: Competition and Control. Ballinger Publishing.

References

External links 
MacLeod MD, Gordon K. 2006. . Pittsburgh, PA: University of Pittsburgh.
Guidry, Nate. 2007. Obituary: Gordon K. MacLeod / Ex-professor at Pitt and former state secretary of health: Jan. 30, 1929-Nov. 25, 2007. (Also: http://www.post-gazette.com/pg/07330/836778-122.stm#ixzz0bavNqdHW). November 26. Pittsburgh, PA: Pittsburgh Post-Gazette.
Hart, Peter. 2007. Obituary: Gordon K. MacLeod. December 6. Volume 40 Issue 8. Pittsburgh, PA: University of Pittsburgh's University Times. (See, too: University Times Back Issues http://www.utimes.pitt.edu/?page_id=6763).
Steele, Bruce, 1997. MacLeod elected Senate president. May 15. Volume 29 Issue 18. Pittsburgh, PA: University of Pittsburgh's University Times.

1929 births
2007 deaths
American healthcare managers
Yale School of Medicine faculty
Physicians from Pennsylvania